TJ Stráža is a Slovak football team, based in the town of Stráža.

Colours
TBA

External links
Futbalnet profile

References

Football clubs in Slovakia